Unleashed is the fourth studio album by American rapper Paris, released on February 24, 1998, by Whirling Records.

"Blast First" was a moderate success, making the Billboard Hot R&B Singles chart.

Critical reception
Nathan Rabin, in AllMusic, wrote that "Paris' gruff baritone remains as powerful and commanding as ever, but it's depressing to hear someone whose work once resonated with conviction and idealism spit gangsta rap clichés like some sort of lost Suge Knight flunky."

Track listing 
 "Mob on" (featuring Spice 1) - 3:35
 "Blast First" - 3:56
 "Record Label Murder" - 2:30
 "Fair Weather Friendz" - 4:26 
 "Everyday Livin'" (featuring Jet) - 3:51
 "Thug Livin'" (featuring Nutt-So) - 5:13
 "Root of All Evil" - 4:09
 "Heat" (featuring Jet, Spice 1) - 3:43
 "Street Soldier" - 4:26
 "44 Wayz" (featuring Mystic) - 4:12
 "Conversation" - 3:35
 "Same Ol' Same Ol'" (featuring Jet) - 4:19

European release

	Mob On
	Fair Weather Friendz
	Ride With Me
	Act Right
	Street Soldier
	It Don't Stop
	44 Wayz
	Root Of All Evil
	Widow (featuring The Conscious Daughters)
	Sucka Free (featuring Spice 1)
	Record Label Murder
	Conversation
	4 da Ridaz (Instrumental)
	Blast First

References 

Paris (rapper) albums
1998 albums
G-funk albums
Political music albums by American artists